Angels and Demons at Play is a jazz album by Sun Ra and his Myth Science Arkestra.

Side one was recorded in 1960, including two tracks taken from the mammoth session either at Hall Recording Company or at the RCA Studios (both in Chicago), around 17 June 1960, whilst the tracks on side two were recorded at the RCA studios, Chicago, around February 1956. Saturn Records had issued at least three of the songs ("Medicine for a Nightmare" b/w "Urnack", and "A Call For All Demons", the B-side of an early version of the song "Saturn") as 7-inch singles.

According to the musicologist Robert L. Campbell, the latter single was probably the first Saturn release. It was a relatively common theme of Saturn releases to feature different sessions, from different eras with different personnel, on different sides of a record. Other examples include The Invisible Shield (1962/1970) and Deep Purple (1948-57/1973).

The distinctive sleeve was designed by Sun Ra, and uses the same design on both sides, leaving no room for sleeve notes.

Track listing

12" Vinyl 
All titles were written by Sun Ra, except where noted.
Side A:
 "Tiny Pyramids" (Ronnie Boykins) – 3:38
 "Between Two Worlds" – 1:56
 "Music from the World Tomorrow" – 2:20
 "Angels and Demons at Play" (Marshall Allen, Ronnie Boykins) – 2:51

Side B:
 "Urnack" (Julian Priester) – 3:46
 "Medicine for a Nightmare" – 2:16
 "A Call for All Demons" – 4:12
 "Demon's Lullaby" – 2:35

The 1993 compact disc release appends the album The Nubians of Plutonia in its entirety.

Musicians
On "Urnack", "Medicine for a Nightmare", "A Call For Demons", and "Demon's Lullaby", recorded RCA Studios, Chicago, around February 1956;
 Sun Ra - Piano, Electric Piano
 Art Hoyle - Trumpet,
 Julian Priester - Trombone
 John Gilmore - Tenor Sax
 Pat Patrick - Baritone Sax
 Wilburn Green - Electric Bass
 Robert Barry - Drums
 Jim Herndon - Tympani

On "Tiny Pyramids" and "Angels And Demons At Play", RCA Studios Chicago, around June 17, 1960;
 Sun Ra - Percussion, Bells, Gong and Piano
 Phil Cohran - Cornet
 Nate Pryor - Trombone and Bells
 John Gilmore - Tenor Sax and Clarinet, percussion
 Marshall Allen - Flute
 Ronnie Boykins - Bass
 Jon Hardy - Drums, Percussion

On "Between Two Worlds" recorded during rehearsals at the same time;
 Sun Ra - Piano
 possibly Bo Bailey - Trombone
 John Gilmore - Tenor Sax
 Marshall Allen - Alto Sax
 Ronnie Boykins - Bass
 possibly Robert Barry - Drums

On "Music From The World Tomorrow", also recorded during rehearsals in Chicago, 1960;
 Sun Ra - 'Cosmic tone organ
 Ronnie Boykins - Bass
 Phil Cohran - Violin-uke
 Jon Hardy - Drums

Release history

References

External links 
 Complete Sun Ra's Discography

Sun Ra albums
1960 albums
El Saturn Records albums
Impulse! Records albums
Evidence Music albums